Lucien Moutassie (born 3 May 1988) is a footballer who plays as a defensive midfielder.

Born in Cameroon, he was a member, as a naturalized citizen, of the Equatorial Guinea national team.

National team
Like many foreign players who have played or are currently playing in the league of Equatorial Guinea, Moutassie was naturalized in that country (where he was renamed Luciano Mutasi Mba) and called for the Equatoguinean squad in the 2006 CEMAC Cup, the Africa Cup of Nations 2008 Qualifying and in friendly matches.

Honours

International

 CEMAC Cup
Winner (1): 2006

References

External links
Fútbol Estadísticas 

1988 births
Living people
Naturalized citizens of Equatorial Guinea
Equatoguinean footballers
Equatorial Guinea international footballers
Cameroonian footballers
Association football midfielders
UD Tijarafe players
Cameroonian expatriate footballers
Cameroonian expatriate sportspeople in Spain
Expatriate footballers in Spain
Cameroonian expatriate sportspeople in Malta
Expatriate footballers in Malta
Cameroonian emigrants to Equatorial Guinea
Deportivo Mongomo players
Gozo Football League First Division players